James Sadler (February 1753 – 28 March 1828) was the first English balloonist, as well as a chemist and pastry chef.

Life 

Sadler worked as a pastry chef in the family business, The Lemon Hall Refreshment House, a small shop in Oxford.

Sadler was the second person to make a balloon ascent in England, very soon after the Tuscan Vincent Lunardi's flight on 15 September 1784 in the grounds of the Honourable Artillery Company at Moorfields. James Sadler was still the first English Aeronaut, making his ascent the following month, on 4 October 1784 from Christ Church Meadow, Oxford.

Sadler's second ascent occurred on 12 November, this time in a hydrogen-filled balloon. It reached Aylesbury in Buckinghamshire after a twenty-minute flight.

In May of the following year he took off near Moulsey Hurst, Surrey, accompanied by W. Wyndham MP, hoping to reach France, but in fact descending in the Thames Estuary, and thus failing to repeat the earlier exploit of Jean-Pierre Blanchard and his passenger. 
Sadler made two further ascents in May 1785, the first of which was from a field behind a gentleman's garden on the site of what is now Balloon Street in Manchester. On this flight he was accompanied by a cat and landed in Radcliffe. 

Sadler was appointed Chemist in 1796 in the newly created Naval Works Department under Sir Samuel Bentham. Although the post was only abolished in 1807, he had major disagreements with Bentham and carried out few works. His most important invention was that of the table steam engine. Sadler was responsible for improvements to cannon design, from the barrel to the shot used, to improve accuracy; for which he was praised by Admiral Lord Nelson.

He resumed his ballooning activities although he was devastated by the death of his younger son, Windham William Sadler, in a ballooning accident in 1824.<ref>The Kalaidoscope or Literary and Scientific Mirror, Volume 5, 1825, p 116/117.</ref>

James Sadler is buried at the church of St Peter-in-the-East in Oxford, now part of the college St Edmund Hall.

 Legacy 
Although a celebrity in his own time, Sadler is largely unknown today. This has been partly attributed to his lack of writing any works and partly to class prejudice: he was only a pastry chef and not formally educated. Despite being a resident of Oxford and an accomplished scientist, the university mostly ignored him and academics looked down on him. While obituaries for Sadler were written elsewhere on his death, the university's own newspaper wrote simply, "Mr James Sadler, elder brother of Mr Sadler of Rose Hill, Oxford, has died."

A public square in Manchester was named after Sadler on 8 September 2015 by NOMA, which is a neighbourhood being developed in partnership by The Co-operative Group and Hermes Investment Management. The square is named Sadler's Yard and is near to Balloon Street.

 Selected balloon ascents 

 7 July 1810: at Oxford, on the occasion of the installation of Lord Grenville as Chancellor at Oxford University.
 September 1810: from Bristol, with the chemist William Clayfield, landing safely near Combe Martin in the Bristol Channel.
 29 August 1811: from Hackney to East Thorpe in Essex (near Colchester), with Henry Beaufoy (1786–1851); a number of experiments were performed.
 1 October 1812: from Belvedere House near Drumcondra, Ireland,  attempting to cross the Irish Sea; he almost drowned in the attempt but was finally picked up by a fishing boat, in the Irish Channel, off Liverpool.

 References 

Further reading
 Mark Davies: King of all balloons : the adventurous life of James Sadler, the first English aeronaut, Stroud, Gloucestershire : Amberley [2015], 
Jane Browne [part 1 of biographical novel based on life & adventures of James Sadler]: The Oxford Aeronaut Part 1: from Cooking to Chemistry 
Jane Browne [part 2 of biographical novel, based on life 7 adventures of James Sadler]: The Oxford Aeronaut Part 2: The King of Ballooning 
Richard O Smith [autobiography with biography of James Sadler]: The Man With HIs Head in the Clouds ''

External links 
 Pennine Region Balloon Association: James Sadler
 Balloonists at the Turn of the 18th & 19th Century, The English Flights — James Sadler 
 The Man With his Head in the Clouds: James Sadler, The First Englishman to Fly by Richard O. Smith
The Oxford Aeronaut part 1: From Cooking to Chemistry by Jane Browne
The Oxford Aeronaut part 2: King of Ballooning by Jane Browne

1753 births
1828 deaths
English balloonists
History of Oxford
English inventors
Balloon flight record holders
British aviation pioneers
British aviation record holders
Pastry chefs
English chefs
Male chefs
18th-century English chemists
19th-century English chemists